Cyril III, surnamed Spanos (Σπανός), (? – after 1654), was Ecumenical Patriarch of Constantinople for two short terms in 1652 and 1654. He hailed from Xanthi and also served as bishop of Corinth (1655–75), Philippopolis and Tarnovo.

|-

17th-century Greek clergy
Orthodox bishops of Corinth
People from Xanthi
Metropolitans of Tarnovo
Metropolitans of Plovdiv
17th-century Ecumenical Patriarchs of Constantinople